Nedumpura  is a village in Thrissur district in the state of Kerala, India.

Demographics
 India census, Nedumpura had a population of 10627 with 4992 males and 5635 females.

References

Villages in Thrissur district